The 1926–27 Serie A season was the third season of the Serie A, the top level of ice hockey in Italy. Two teams participated in the league, and Hockey Club Milano won the championship by defeating GSD Cortina in the final.

Final
 Hockey Club Milano - GSD Cortina 7:1 (6:1, 1:0)

External links
 Season on hockeytime.net

1926–27 in Italian ice hockey
Serie A (ice hockey) seasons
Italy